The bibliography of Philip K. Dick includes 44 novels, 121 short stories, and 14 short story collections published by American science fiction author Philip K. Dick (December 16, 1928 – March 2, 1982)  during his lifetime.

At the time of his death, Dick's work was generally known to only science fiction readers, and many of his novels and short stories were out of print. To date, a total of 44 novels have been published and translations have appeared in 25 languages. Six volumes of selected correspondence, written by Dick from 1938 through 1982, were published between 1991 and 2009.

The Library of America has issued three collections of Dick's novels.  The first, published in June 2007,  contained The Man in the High Castle, The Three Stigmata of Palmer Eldritch, Do Androids Dream of Electric Sheep? and Ubik, and was the first time science fiction was included in the LOA canon.  The second collection was issued in July 2008, and included Martian Time Slip, Dr. Bloodmoney, Now Wait for Last Year, Flow My Tears, the Policeman Said, and A Scanner Darkly. The third collection was published in July 2009 and included A Maze of Death and the VALIS trilogy (VALIS, The Divine Invasion, and The Transmigration of Timothy Archer).

At least nine films have been adapted from Dick's work, the first being Blade Runner in 1982.

Recurring themes in Dick's work
Five recurring philosophical themes in Dick's work have been classified by Philip K. Dick scholar Erik Davis:
 False realities
 Human vs. machine
 Entropy
 The nature of God
 Social control

Similarly, in Understanding Philip K. Dick, Eric Carl Link discussed eight themes or 'ideas and motifs':
 Epistemology and the Nature of Reality
 Know Thyself
 The Android and the Human
 Entropy and Pot Healing
 The Theodicy Problem
 Warfare and Power Politics
 The Evolved Human
 'Technology, Media, Drugs and Madness'

Published works
Dates in this bibliography are for completion of first (and usually only) draft. Publication dates follow separately.

(+) indicates subsequent significant expansion
(*) indicates subsequent revision or minor expansion
(LOA#) indicates the volume of the Library of America omnibus (see below)

Novels by year of composition

Library of America
The Library of America has republished 13 of Dick's 44 novels:

2007 Four Novels of the 1960s: The Man in the High Castle/The Three Stigmata of Palmer Eldritch/Do Androids Dream of Electric Sheep?/Ubik 

2008Philip K. Dick: Five Novels of the 1960s and 70s: Martian Time Slip / Dr. Bloodmoney / Now Wait for Last Year / Flow My Tears the Policeman Said / A Scanner Darkly 

2009Philip K. Dick: VALIS and Later Novels: A Maze of Death/VALIS/The Divine Invasion/The Transmigration of Timothy Archer

Short story collections
1955
A Handful of Darkness

1957
The Variable Man And Other Stories

1969
The Preserving Machine

1973
The Book of Philip K. Dick (reissued in 1977 as The Turning Wheel and Other Stories)

1977
The Best of Philip K. Dick

1980
The Golden Man

1984
Robots, Androids, and Mechanical Oddities

1985
I Hope I Shall Arrive Soon

1987
The Collected Stories of Philip K. Dick

1988
Beyond Lies the Wub

1989
Second Variety
The Father-Thing

1990
The Days of Perky Pat
The Little Black Box
The Short Happy Life of the Brown Oxford
We Can Remember It for You Wholesale

1991
The Minority Report
Second Variety

1992
The Eye of the Sibyl

1997
The Philip K. Dick Reader

2002
Minority Report
Selected Stories of Philip K. Dick

2004
Paycheck

2006
Vintage PKD

2009
The Early Work of Philip K. Dick, Volume One: The Variable Man & Other Stories. Prime Books. 
The Early Work of Philip K. Dick, Volume Two: Breakfast at Twilight & Other Stories. Prime Books. November 2009. .

2013
The Best of Philip K. Dick. Introduction by David Gill, Philip K. Dick scholar Echo Point Books & Media.

Comparison of editions
The five volumes of The Collected Stories of Philip K. Dick were re-published and sold separately by Gollancz and later by Citadel Twilight and by Subterranean Press. For the Citadel Twilight editions the volumes were renamed and two stories were moved from one volume to another. The following table provides a comparison of the corresponding volumes from the various editions.

Short stories
1952
"Beyond Lies the Wub"
"The Gun"
"The Little Movement"
"The Skull"

1953

1954

1955

1956
"The Minority Report"
"Pay for the Printer"
"To Serve the Master"
"Vulcan's Hammer"

1957
"Misadjustment"
"The Unreconstructed M"

1958
"Null-O"

1959
"Explorers We"
"Fair Game"
"Recall Mechanism"
"War Game"

1963
"The Days of Perky Pat"
"If There Were No Benny Cemoli"
"Stand-by (also published as Top Stand-by Job)"
"What'll We Do with Ragland Park?"

1964

1965
"Retreat Syndrome"

1966
"Holy Quarrel"
"We Can Remember It for You Wholesale"
"Your Appointment Will Be Yesterday"

1967
"Faith of Our Fathers"
"Return Match"

1968
"Not by Its Cover"
"The Story to End All Stories for Harlan Ellison’s Anthology Dangerous Visions"

1969
"The Electric Ant"
"The War with the Fnools"

1974
"The Pre-persons"
"A Little Something for Us Tempunauts"

1979
"The Exit Door Leads In"

1980
"I Hope I Shall Arrive Soon" (Originally titled "Frozen Journey".)
"Rautavaara's Case"
"Chains of Air, Web of Aether"

1981
"The Alien Mind"

1984
"Strange Memories of Death"

1987
"Cadbury, the Beaver Who Lacked"
"The Day Mr. Computer Fell Out of Its Tree"
"The Eye of the Sibyl"
"Stability"
"A Terran Odyssey"

1988
"Goodbye, Vincent"

Other short works
1987
"Fawn, Look Back" (novel outline)

1992
"The Different Stages of Love" (previously unpublished passage from Flow My Tears, the Policeman Said)

2010
"Menace React" (fragment)

Collected non-fiction
1988: The Dark Haired Girl
1995: The Shifting Realities of Philip K. Dick: Selected Literary and Philosophical Writings
2011: The Exegesis of Philip K. Dick, Jonathan Lethem and Pamela Jackson, eds. Houghton Mifflin Harcourt, publisher

Correspondence
 The Selected Letters of Philip K. Dick, 1938–1971. Grass Valley, California : Underwood Books, 1996 (Trade edition)  (Slipcased edition) 
 The Selected Letters of Philip K. Dick, 1972–1973. Novato, California : Underwood-Miller, 1993 (Trade edition)  (Slipcased edition) 
 The Selected Letters of Philip K. Dick, 1974. Novato, California : Underwood-Miller, 1991 (Trade edition)  (Slipcased edition) 
 The Selected Letters of Philip K. Dick, 1975–1976. Novato, California : Underwood-Miller, 1992 (Trade edition)  (Slipcased edition) 
 The Selected Letters of Philip K. Dick, 1977–1979. Novato, California : Underwood-Miller, 1993 (Trade edition)  (Slipcased edition) 
 The Selected Letters of Philip K. Dick, 1980–1982. Nevada City, California : Underwood Books, 2009 (Trade edition)  (Slipcased edition)

Film adaptations

Further reading
Primary bibliographies
 PRECIOUS ARTIFACTS: A Philip K. Dick Bibliography, United States of America and United Kingdom Editions, 1955 - 2012. Compiled by Henri Wintz and David Hyde. (Wide Books 2012).     www.wide-books.com Full color, 142 pages
 PRECIOUS ARTIFACTS 2: A Philip K. Dick Bibliography, The Short Stories, United States, United Kingdom and Oceania, 1952 - 2014. Compiled by Henri Wintz and David Hyde (Wide Books 2014).     www.wide-books.com Full color, 216 pages

Biographies
 Arnold, Kyle (2016), The Divine Madness of Philip K. Dick. Oxford University Press. 
 Capanna, Pablo (1995). Philip K. Dick - Idios Kosmos. Almagesto (Spanish Language) 
 Carrère, Emmanuel. Bent, Timothy. (translator) (2005). I Am Alive and You Are Dead: A Journey into the Mind of Philip K. Dick. Picador.  
 Dick, Ann R. (Former Wife). (1995). Search for Philip K. Dick, 1928-1982: A Memoir and Biography of the Science Fiction Writer. Edwin Mellen Press. 
 Mason, Darryl. (In Progress). The Biography of Philip K. Dick. Gollancz. 
 Mini, Anne. A Family Darkly : Love, Loss, and the Final Passions of Philip K. Dick. Carroll & Graf.  (Unpublished)
 Peake, Anthony. (2013). A Life of Philip K. Dick - A Man Who Remembered the Future. Arcturus Publishing Limited. 
 Queyssi, Laurent & Marchesi, Mauro (2019). Philip K. Dick, a comics biography, NBM. 
 Rickman, Gregg. (1989). To the High Castle: Philip K. Dick: A Life 1928-1962. Fragments West. 
 Sutin, Lawrence (Official biographer). (1989). Divine Invasions: A Life of Philip K. Dick. Citadel Press; Rep edition. 
 Williams, Paul. (1986). Only Apparently Real: The World of Philip K. Dick. Entwhistle Books. 
 Wilson, Colin. "Was Philip K. Dick Possessed by an Angel?" (1992) in Unsolved Mysteries Past and Present. Contemporary Books.

Interviews
 Apel, D. Scott. (1999). Philip K. Dick : The Dream Connection. The Impermanent Press. 
 Lee, Gwen (ed). (2000) What If Our World Is Their Heaven? The Final Conversations Of Philip K. Dick. Overlook Press. 
 Rickman, Gregg. (1984). Philip K. Dick: In His Own Words. Fragments West.
 Rickman, Gregg. (1985). Philip K. Dick: The Last Testament. Fragments West.

Book-length critical studies
 Arnold, Kyle. (2016). The Divine Madness of Philip K. Dick. Oxford University Press.
 Barlow, Aaron. (2005). How Much Does Chaos Scare You?: Politics, Religion, And Philosophy in the Fiction of Philip K. Dick. Lulu Press. 
 Butler, Andrew M. (2000). Philip K. Dick. Pocket Essentials. 
 Butler, Andrew M. (2007). Philip K. Dick. [Enlarged edition] Pocket Essentials. 
 De Angelis, Valerio Massimo and Umberto Rossi (eds.) (2006). Trasmigrazioni: I mondi di Philip K. Dick. Le Monnier. 
 Frasca, Gabriele (2007). L'oscuro scrutare di Philip K. Dick. Meltemi. 
 Caronia, Antonio and Domenico Gallo (eds.) (2006). La macchina della paranoia: Enciclopedia dickiana. X Book. 
 Kerman, Judith B. (ed.). Retrofitting Blade Runner: Issues in Ridley Scott’s Blade Runner and Philip K. Dick’s Do Androids Dream of Electric Sheep (1991). Rpt. Madison: The University of Wisconsin Press (1995). 
 Kucukalic, Lejla (2008). Philip K. Dick: Canonical Writer of the Digital Age. London: Routledge. 
 Lemant, Aurélien (2012). TRAUM : Philip K. Dick, le martyr onirique. Editions Le Feu Sacré.  
 Link, Eric Carl (2010). Understanding Philip K. Dick. Columbia: The University of South Carolina Press.  
 Lampe, Evan (2015). Philip K. Dick and the World We Live In Wide Books.  
 Lord R.C. (2007) PINK BEAM: A Philip K. Dick Companion Lulu Publishers. Trade paperback, 322pp. 
 Mackey, Douglas A. (1988). Philip K. Dick. Twayne. 
 McKee, Gabriel. (2004). Pink Beams of Light from the God in the Gutter : The Science-Fictional Religion of Philip K. Dick. University Press of America. 
 Mullen, R.D. (editor). (1992). On Philip K. Dick: 40 Articles from Science-Fiction Studies. SF-TH. 
 Olander, Joseph D. and Martin Harry Greenberg (eds.) (1983). Philip K. Dick. New York: Taplinger.
 Palmer, Christopher. (2003). Philip K. Dick : Exhilaration and Terror of the Postmodern. Liverpool Univ. Press. 
 Pierce, Hazel. (1982). Philip K. Dick. Borgo Press. 
 Rickels, Laurence A. (2010). I Think I Am: Philip K. Dick, Minneapolis: University of Minnesota Press. 
 Rispoli, Francesca (2001). Universi che cadono a pezzi: La fantascienza di Philip K. Dick. Milano: Bruno Mondadori.
 Robb, Brian J. (2006). Counterfeit Worlds: Philip K. Dick On Film. Titan Books (UK). 
 Robinson, Kim Stanley (1989). The Novels of Philip K. Dick. Umi Research Press. 
 Rossi, Umberto (2011). The Twisted Worlds of Philip K. Dick: A Reading of Twenty Ontologically Uncertain Novels, Jefferson: McFarland. 
 Umland, Stanley J. (1995). Philip K. Dick: Contemporary Critical Interpretations. Greenwood Press. 
 Vest, Jason P. (2009). The Postmodern Humanism of Philip K. Dick. Lanham: The Scarecrow Press. 
 Viviani, Gianfranco and Carlo Pagetti (eds.) (1989). Philip K. Dick: Il sogno dei simulacri. Nord. ISBN n.a.
 Warrick, Patricia S. (1987). Mind in Motion: The Fiction of Philip K. Dick. Southern Illinois Univ. Press. 
 Warrick, Patricia S. (1986). Robots, Androids, and Mechanical Oddities: The Science Fiction of Philip K. Dick. Southern Illinois Univ. Press.

Notes

External links

 

Philip K. Dick OCLC WorldCat Identity
A complete pictorial bibliography of Philip K. Dick
How To Build A Universe That Doesn't Fall Apart Two Days Later (Essay by PKD on his "discovery" that we are living in the Roman Empire)

Bibliographies by writer

Bibliographies of American writers
Science fiction bibliographies